Farheekhtegan ("Intellectuals") is a national Iranian Persian-language newspaper. With ISSN 2008-4765 and OCLC Number 433127552, the newspaper is focused on academic, cultural, political, social, economic and sports news.

History 
Farheekhtegan was first published in April 1993 as a weekly magazine, mainly covering the news around the Islamic Azad University.  On 20 May 2009, Farheekhtegan, then evolved to a daily newspaper, came out to the kiosks around Iran for the first time. The newspaper continued daily publication in Persian language since then and occasionally was also published in English.

Circulation 
In addition to the typical Iranian distribution system of written materials through the kiosks and libraries in Tehran and other major cities, Farheekhtegan also enjoys a dedicated circulation system among Islamic Azad University branches around the country.

See also 
 Hamshahri
 Media of Iran

References

External links 

Latest English edition
Farheekhtegan on IFPnews
Farheekhtegan on Worldcat

1993 establishments in Iran
Newspapers established in 2009
Newspapers published in Tehran
Persian-language newspapers
Magazines established in 1993